John D. Rood (born February 11, 1955) is an American businessman and diplomat who served as the United States Ambassador to the Bahamas from 2004 to 2007.

Rood is Chairman and Founder of The Vestcor Companies, Inc.  He is a graduate of Arizona State University and a bachelor's degree in business administration from the University of Montana.

References

1955 births
Living people
Ambassadors of the United States to the Bahamas
Florida Republicans
American company founders
Arizona State University alumni